Dalibor Ilić (born 4 March 2000) is a Serbian professional basketball player for Crvena zvezda of the Adriatic League and the EuroLeague.

Early career  
Born in Višegrad, Republika Srpska, Bosnia and Herzegovina, Ilić started to play basketball for youth system of his hometown team Varda. In 2015, he joined youth teams of Igokea from Aleksandrovac. He won the third place at the 2017–18 Junior ABA League season with the Igokea U19 team. Over six season games, he averaged 20.8 points, 10.7 rebounds and 3.5 assists per game. Ilić won the third place at the 2018–19 Junior ABA League season with the Igokea U19 team. Over six season games, he averaged 26.7 points, 16.8 rebounds and 2.8 assists per game.

Professional career 
In 2016, Ilić was promoted to the Igokea first team. On 30 October 2016 he made his ABA League debut in a game against Cedevita. In March 2019, was loaned out to Mega Bemax for the rest of the 2018–19 Serbian League season.

Following the 2020–21 season Ilić declared himself for the 2021 NBA draft. On July 19, 2021, he withdrawn his name from consideration for the 2021 NBA draft.

On 14 July 2022, Ilić signed a four-year contract with Serbian club Crvena zvezda of the EuroLeague.

National team career 
Ilić was a member of the Serbian U16 team at the 2016 FIBA Europe Under-16 Championship. Over seven tournament games, he averaged 7.0 points, 5.6 rebounds and 2.6 assists per game. He was a member and the team captain of the Serbian U18 team that won the gold medal at the 2018 FIBA Europe Under-18 Championship in Latvia. Over seven tournament games, he averaged 9.3 points, 6.0 rebounds and 2.9 assists per game.

Ilić was a member of the Serbian under-19 team that finished 7th at the 2019 FIBA Under-19 Basketball World Cup in Heraklion, Greece. Over seven tournament games, he averaged 10.9 points, 11.0 rebounds and 3.3 assists per game.

References

External links 
 
 Profile at realgm.com
 Profile at aba-liga.com

2000 births
Living people
ABA League players
Basketball League of Serbia players
Bosnia and Herzegovina expatriate basketball people in Serbia
Bosnia and Herzegovina men's basketball players
KK Crvena zvezda players
KK Igokea players
KK Mega Basket players
People from Višegrad
Power forwards (basketball)
Serbian expatriate basketball people in Bosnia and Herzegovina
Serbian men's basketball players
Serbs of Bosnia and Herzegovina
Small forwards